This is a list of Nevada suffragists, suffrage groups and others associated with the cause of women's suffrage in Nevada.

Groups 

 Churchill County Equal Suffrage League.
Douglas County Equal Suffrage League.
Esmerelda County Equal Suffrage League.
Eureka County Equal Suffrage League.
Humboldt County Equal Suffrage League.
Lucy Stone Non-Partisan Equal Suffrage League, formed in Austin, Nevada in 1894.
The Men's League of Nevada, created in 1914.
Nevada Equal Franchise Society (NEFS).
Nevada Equal Suffrage Association, formed in 1895.
Nevada Federation of Women's Clubs.
Non-Militant Suffrage Association, formed in 1911.
Ormsby County Equal Suffrage League.
Sparks Equal Suffrage League.
State Equal Suffrage Association.
Storey County Equal Suffrage League.
Washoe County Equal Suffrage League.
Women's Christian Temperance Union (WCTU).

Suffragists 

Mary Babcock.
Hellen Ann Lovelock Bonnifield (Winnemucca).
Mae Caine
Hanna K. Clapp.
Felice Cohn (Carson City).
Eliza Cook (Douglas County).
Mary Stoddard Doten.
Bessie R. Lucas Eichelberger (Reno and Washoe County).
Minnie Flannigan.
Maud Gassoway.
John I. Ginn (Elko).
Laura DeForce Gordon (Virginia City).
Florence Humphrey (Washoe).
Sadie D. Hurst (Washoe).
Alexandrine La Tourette.
Sarah Emeline Mack (Reno).
Anne Henrietta Martin (Reno).
Mila Tupper Maynard (Reno).
Helena Suzanne Bidwell Norton (Reno).
Elda Ann Williams Simpson Orr (Reno).
 Delphine Squires (Las Vegas).
Fannie Weller (Austin).
Frances Slaven Williamson (Austin and Reno).
 Bird Wilson (Goldfield).
Jeanne Wier.

Politicians who supported women's suffrage 

 M. S. Bonnifield (Humboldt County).
Oscar Grey.
Curtis J. Hillyer (Storey County).

Publications 

 The Nevada Citizen, published by Frances Slaven Williamson and Mary Laura Williamson.

Suffragists who campaigned in Nevada 

 Jane Addams.
Susan B. Anthony.
Bessie Beatty.
Harriot Stanton Blatch.
Lucy Burns.
Laura Gregg Cannon.
Carrie Chapman Catt.
Anne Constable.
Grace Cotterill.
Minnie Fisher Cunningham.
 Emma Smith DeVoe.
Sara Bard Field.
Margaret A. Foley.
Antoinette Funk.
Charlotte Perkins Gilman.
Florence Bayard Hilles.
Rosalie Jones.
Caroline Katzenstein.
Annie Kenney.
Harriet Burton Laidlaw.
James Lees Laidlaw.
Gail Laughlin.
Maud Leonard McCreery.
Alice Park.
Valeria H. Parker.
Ella Riegel.
Mary E. Ringrose.
Elizabeth Selden Rogers.
Marjorie Shuler.
 Anna Howard Shaw.
Mary Sperry.
Elizabeth Cady Stanton.
Emily A. Pitts Stevens.
Eleanor Stewart.
Helen Todd.
Mabel Vernon.
Charlotte Anita Whitney.
Maud Younger.

Anti-suffragists 
People
Emma Adams.
Anna Fitch.
George Wingfield.
Groups

 Nevada Association of Women Opposed to Equal Suffrage (NAWOWS).

Anti-suffragists who campaigned in Nevada

 Minnie Bronson.

See also 

 Timeline of women's suffrage in Nevada
 Women's suffrage in Nevada
 Women's suffrage in states of the United States
 Women's suffrage in the United States

References

Sources 

 

Nevada suffrage

Nevada suffragists
Activists from Nevada
History of Nevada
Suffragists